In category theory, a branch of mathematics, a monoid (or monoid object, or internal monoid, or algebra)  in a monoidal category  is an object M together with two morphisms
 μ: M ⊗ M → M called multiplication,
 η: I → M called unit,
such that the pentagon diagram

and the unitor diagram

commute.

Dually, a comonoid in a monoidal category C is a monoid in the dual category Cop.

Suppose that the monoidal category C has a symmetry γ. A monoid M in C is commutative when .

Examples 
 A monoid object in Set, the category of sets (with the monoidal structure induced by the Cartesian product), is a monoid in the usual sense.
 A monoid object in Top, the category of topological spaces (with the monoidal structure induced by the product topology), is a topological monoid.
 A monoid object in the category of monoids (with the direct product of monoids) is just a commutative monoid. This follows easily from the Eckmann–Hilton argument.
 A monoid object in the category of complete join-semilattices Sup (with the monoidal structure induced by the Cartesian product) is a unital quantale.
 A monoid object in (Ab, ⊗Z, Z), the category of abelian groups, is a ring.
 For a commutative ring R, a monoid object in 
 (R-Mod, ⊗R, R), the category of modules over R, is an R-algebra.
 the category of graded modules is a graded R-algebra.
 the category of chain complexes of R-modules is a differential graded algebra.
 A monoid object in K-Vect, the category of K-vector spaces (again, with the tensor product), is a K-algebra, and a comonoid object is a K-coalgebra.
 For any category C, the category [C,C] of its endofunctors has a monoidal structure induced by the composition and the identity functor IC. A monoid object in [C,C] is a monad on C.
 For any category with a terminal object and finite products, every object becomes a comonoid object via the diagonal morphism . Dually in a category with an initial object and finite coproducts every object becomes a monoid object via .

Categories of monoids 
Given two monoids (M, μ, η) and (M', μ', η') in a monoidal category C, a morphism f : M → M ' is a morphism of monoids when
 f o μ = μ''' o (f ⊗ f),
 f o η = η.
In other words, the following diagrams

, 

commute.

The category of monoids in C and their monoid morphisms is written Mon'''C.

See also 
 Act-S, the category of monoids acting on sets

References

Monoidal categories
Objects (category theory)
Categories in category theory